Super Reds Football Club was a South Korean professional football club which played as a foreign team in Singapore's S.League between 2007 and 2009.

History 

The creation of the club in 2007 was driven by the Korean community in Singapore. Parties involved in the governance of the club include the Korean Association of Singapore, and the Korean business community and Korean embassy in Singapore. 
The club was originally known as Korean Super Reds FC, but changed its name to Super Reds FC in August 2007.

The team play their home games at the Yishun Stadium.

The club's founding chairman and coach was the Korean football guru Hong In-Woong, who was previously the Technical Director of Sporting Afrique FC. His successor is Charlie Yoon, who was the CEO of the club's main sponsor, QT Technology Pte Ltd.

Attempt at Localizing 

After the 2009 season, Super Reds FC retained just four players from the 2009 season in an attempt to convert into a local team and renamed the team as Yishun Super Reds FC, but the newly reformed Yishun Super Reds FC was denied a place in the 2010 S.League.

Seasons

Sponsors 

 Main Sponsor: QT Technology
 Kit Supplier: Waga

Final squad
As of July 5, 2009

Nationality given from place of birth

Current Coaching Staff

 Jeon Kyung-jun (Player-Coach)
 Shin Hyun-Ho (Player-Assistant Coach)
 Bae Jin-Soo (assistant coach)

References

External links 
 Super Reds FC Official Site

Foreign teams in Singapore football leagues
Expatriated football clubs
Singapore Premier League clubs